Marílson Gomes dos Santos (born 6 August 1977) is a Brazilian long-distance runner. He won the 2006 and 2008 New York City Marathon, becoming the first South American to win the race. He was selected as the best male performer at the 2009 Brazilian national championships after breaking the meet records in both the 5000 metres and 10,000 metres races. He is the current South American record holder in both these events with times of 13:19.43 and 27:28.12, respectively.

He has won medals at the South American Cross Country Championships, starting with a silver in the junior race in 1996, then taking the bronze in the men's long race in 2000, before winning his first championship title in 2008.

He ran at the 2010 London Marathon and came close to a personal best time, finishing in 2:08:46 for sixth place behind Abel Kirui. He signed up for the New York Marathon that year and used the Troféu Brasil de Atletismo (the Brazilian athletics championships) as his preparation, winning the 10,000 m title. He secured his third career win at the Saint Silvester Race in São Paulo at the end of the year – a record number for a Brazilian runner since the opening of the run for international participant (since 1945).

At the 2011 London Marathon, he set a personal best of 2:06:34 hours and placed fourth in the fast race behind a Kenyan trio of Emmanuel Mutai, Martin Lel and Patrick Makau.

Dos Santos competed in the marathon at the 2008, 2012 Summer Olympics and 2016 Olympics with the best result of fifth place in 2012. He is married to Juliana Paula dos Santos, a fellow runner who won gold medals at the 2007 and 2015 Pan American Games. They have a son Miguel.

Competition record

References

External links

Tilastopaja biography
Focus on Athletes article
"Gomes wins, Prokopcuka repeats at NYC Marathon"
Interview with Men's Racing
marathoninfo

1977 births
Living people
Sportspeople from Brasília
Brazilian male long-distance runners
Brazilian male marathon runners
Olympic athletes of Brazil
Athletes (track and field) at the 2008 Summer Olympics
Athletes (track and field) at the 2012 Summer Olympics
Athletes (track and field) at the 2016 Summer Olympics
Pan American Games athletes for Brazil
Pan American Games gold medalists for Brazil
Pan American Games medalists in athletics (track and field)
Athletes (track and field) at the 2003 Pan American Games
Athletes (track and field) at the 2007 Pan American Games
Athletes (track and field) at the 2011 Pan American Games
New York City Marathon male winners
Pan American Games silver medalists for Brazil
Pan American Games bronze medalists for Brazil
Universiade medalists in athletics (track and field)
Universiade gold medalists for Brazil
Medalists at the 2007 Pan American Games
Medalists at the 2011 Pan American Games
20th-century Brazilian people
21st-century Brazilian people